Mostafizur Rahman Patal is a Bangladesh Awami League politician and the former Member of Parliament of Bogra-5.

Career
Patal was elected to parliament from Bogra-5 as a Bangladesh Awami League candidate in 1973.

Death
Patal was assassinated in November 1974.

References

Awami League politicians
1974 deaths
1st Jatiya Sangsad members